"How Many Drinks?" is a song by American recording artist Miguel, taken from his critically acclaimed second studio album, Kaleidoscope Dream. The song was produced by Salaam Remi. A remixed single featuring Kendrick Lamar on an added third verse was released as the album's third single on March 3, 2013. It received a nomination for Best R&B Performance at the 56th Grammy Awards held in January 2014. The chorus melody samples the O'Donel Levy instrumental cover of The Carpenters song We've Only Just Begun.

Music video
The music video, directed by Clark Jackson, was released on April 22, 2013 on VEVO.

Chart performance 
The song debuted at 88 on the Billboard Hot 100 on week ending May 4, 2013. It has since peaked at #69 on the week of July 20, 2013, and spent a total of 20 weeks on the chart.

Certifications

References

2012 songs
2013 singles
Kendrick Lamar songs
Songs written by Kendrick Lamar
Miguel (singer) songs
Songs written by Salaam Remi
Song recordings produced by Salaam Remi
RCA Records singles